Keith John Austin Asche  (born 28 November 1925) is a former Administrator of the Northern Territory of Australia and was the third Chief Justice of the Supreme Court of the Northern Territory.

Early years, education and family
Asche was born in Melbourne, the son of Eric Thomas Asche and Beryl Victoria Asche (née Woinarski). Eric was the nephew of the actor Oscar Asche.

In 1926, Eric Asche (father of Austin Asche) was appointed Legal Assistant in the Crown Law Office, Department of the Government Secretary for the Territory of New Guinea. They departed from Sydney on 25 August, and the family spent a year in Rabaul. Eric then successfully applied for a job in Darwin, and the family sailed on the SS Marella, arriving on 18 February 1928. The family relocated from Rabaul, after a 1-year appointment of Austin's father, to Darwin arriving on the 18 February 1928 on the SS Marella and lived at the Mud Hut (Knight's Folly) before it burnt down on the 31 December 1933. Eric Thomas Asche was one of a small number of lawyers in Darwin at that time and held the position of Crown Law Officer.

Austin Asche attended Darwin Primary School before returning to Melbourne in 1938 and attending Melbourne Grammar School.  He joined the Royal Australian Air Force in 1944 and served until 1946.  Upon discharge he attended the University of Melbourne, where he was a member of Trinity College, and attained a Bachelor of Arts and a Master of Laws degree.  He was admitted to practice on 1 February 1950.

He married Valerie James on 11 April 1958 and they have one son and one daughter.

The Victorian Bar and early judicial office
Asche relocated to Brisbane and was admitted to practice there in February 1951.  Upon returning to Melbourne in 1954 he practised at the Bar until 1975, eventually being appointed as a Queen's Counsel in 1972.  He was a part-time lecturer at the Royal Melbourne Institute of Technology from 1968 to 1975.

In 1976 he was appointed as the first Victorian Judge of the new formed Family Court of Australia.  He was a member of the Royal Melbourne Institute of Technology Council from 1974 to 1976, its vice president from 1977 to 1981 and President from 1981 - 1983.  He was Chancellor of Deakin University from 1983 - 1987 Acting Chief Judge of the Family Court from 1985 - 1986.  He was also a member of the Family Law Council from 1976 to 1979, Chairman of the Inquiry into Teacher Education in Victoria in 1979 and 1980 and a Councillor and later Chairman of the Frankston State College from 1973 - 1979.

During his time in Victoria Asche was an active Freemason and served as Grand Master of the United Grand Lodge of Victoria from 1984 to 1986.

Northern Territory
He was appointed as a Judge of the Supreme Court of the Northern Territory on 14 April 1986 and was appointed as Chief Justice on 17 August 1987 following the retirement of Kevin O'Leary. While Chief Justice he was Chair of the Northern Territory Parole Board and was President of the Northern Territory Division of the Red Cross Society and President of the Northern Territory Branch of the Scout Association. He was also Chancellor of Northern Territory University from 1989 - 1993.

He resigned as Chief Justice on 26 February 1993 to take up appointment as Administrator of the Northern Territory on 1 March. While Administrator he was patron of numerous organisations including being the Northern Territory Chief Scout, an Honorary Colonel in NORFORCE, and a Deputy Prior of the Order of St. John.

He retired in 1997 but is still the Chair of the Northern Territory Law Reform Committee. He is also an adjunct professor in Law and Emeritus Chancellor at the Charles Darwin University.

Honours and awards
He was appointed a Knight of the Order of St. John in 1993 and made a Companion of the Order of Australia in 1994.  He was also awarded Honorary Doctorates from both Deakin University and Charles Darwin University. He was also made Honorary Freeman of the City of Darwin in 2007.

References

1925 births
Living people
Australian King's Counsel
Companions of the Order of Australia
People educated at Melbourne Grammar School
People educated at Trinity College (University of Melbourne)
Administrators of the Northern Territory
Chief Justices of the Northern Territory
Judges of the Supreme Court of the Northern Territory
Charles Darwin University people
Judges of the Family Court of Australia
20th-century Australian judges
Australian Freemasons
Masonic Grand Masters
Royal Australian Air Force personnel of World War II
Military personnel from Melbourne